The Castle of Udine (Italian: Castello di Udine) is a historical building in Udine, northern Italy, built upon a hill in the historical center of the city (138 meters above sea level).

History

The Castle hill was long supposed to be made of drift accumulating during centuries. However, a legend about its origin says that when Attila the Hun (also called the Scourge of God) plundered Aquileia (one of the biggest cities of the Roman Empire at that time) in the year 452, he asked his soldiers to build a hill to see the Aquileia burning. This was made by filling the helmet of each soldier with ground.

Recent studies (April 2022) showed that the hill is artificial, but much older than the legend presupposes. In fact, the origins of the hill are in the bronze age, and it might date to a period between 3000 and 3500 years ago, contemporary
to the slightly higher Silbury Hill in Wiltshire, England. However the castle Hill in Udine is bigger by volume, making it the biggest prehistoric mound in Europe.

The first official statement of the existence of a building on the hill dates back to 983: the Holy Roman Emperor Otto II donated to Rodoaldo, Patriarch of Aquileia a "castrum", a military building.

The present building has the form of a palace and it was built on the ruins of a fortress destroyed in the year 1511 Idrija earthquake. The construction had started in 1517 and the works had lasted for 50 years. The external decoration of the palace and the paintings in the Parliament Hall are due to Giovanni da Udine, one of the pupils of Raphael.

The council of the Patria del Friuli was one of the first parliaments in the world, and it was suppressed after the French occupation in 1797.

Today the castle hosts the History and Art Museum of the City of Udine.

References 

Castle
Castles in Friuli-Venezia Giulia
Museums in Friuli-Venezia Giulia
Local museums in Italy